The Tel Siran inscription is an inscription on a bronze bottle (or "situla") found at Tel Siran on the campus of the University of Jordan in Amman). It was first published on 27 April 1972.  It is considered the first complete inscription in the "Ammonite language". The bronze bottle is now in the Jordan Archaeological Museum. It is known as KAI 308.

Description 
The well preserved bronze bottle is about ten centimeters long and weighs about 280 grams. The clearly legible inscription is on the outside. The archaeological context suggests that the bottle was in use until the Mamluk period. The bottle is considered to have been made in the Iron Age II period, which would suggest use for 2,000 years.

The contents of the bottle were seeds of barley, wheat and grass, as well as unidentifiable metal remains. A C14 analysis found the content to be about 460 BC.

The inscription 
The inscription consists of eight lines of legible text. They are attached in the direction from the opening of the bottle to its bottom. Line four protrudes into this floor, while line 5 only contains a single word. It has been translated as:

F. Zayadine and H. O. Thompson, the first editors, referred to the script as Aramaic script and dated the inscription paleographically to the first half of the 7th century BC. F. M. Cross, on the other hand, sees the inscription as the latest stage of development of the "Ammonite language" and dates it to around 600 BC for paleographic reasons.

References

Archaeological artifacts
Ancient Near East
Inscriptions
KAI inscriptions